Oberea unipunctata is a species of beetle in the family Cerambycidae. It was described by Gressitt in 1939.

References

Beetles described in 1939
unipunctata